= Director of CIA =

Director of CIA may refer to:

- Director of Central Intelligence
- Director of the Central Intelligence Agency
